The 1988 KFK competitions in Ukraine were part of the 1988 Soviet KFK competitions that were conducted in the Soviet Union. It was 24th season of the KFK in Ukraine since its introduction in 1964. The winner eventually qualified to the 1989 Soviet Second League.

Group 1

Group 2

Group 3

Group 4

Group 5

Group 6

Final

External links
 ukr-footbal.org.ua

Ukrainian Football Amateur League seasons
Amateur